Play.Rock.Music. is the fifth studio album by Toadies produced and mixed by Chris "Frenchie" Smith at The Bubble studio in Austin,TX. It was released July 31, 2012 on Kirtland Records. It's the first Toadies album to feature Doni Blair on bass.

Originally, the band had planned to release the album as the first of two EPs. However, in an interview, guitarist Clark Vogeler announced that the band had decided to release a full album instead.

On March 13, 2012, a promotional music video of the first single "Summer of the Strange" was posted on Vogeler's YouTube Channel.

Track listing

Personnel
 Todd Lewis - vocals, guitar
 Mark Reznicek - drums
 Clark Vogeler - guitar
 Doni Blair - bass

Charts

External links
Toadies official website

References

Toadies albums
2012 albums
Kirtland Records albums